WQHY (95.5 FM) is a 100,000 watt radio station  broadcasting a Top 40 (CHR) format. Licensed to Prestonsburg, Kentucky, United States.  The station is currently owned by Wdoc, Inc. The station is an ABC affiliate.

History
The station went on the air as WDOC-FM on April 3, 1979. Then on August 7, 1981, the station changed its call sign to the current WQHY.

References

External links

QHY
Contemporary hit radio stations in the United States
Prestonsburg, Kentucky